Young's modulus , the Young modulus, or the modulus of elasticity in tension or compression (i.e., negative tension), is a mechanical property that measures the tensile or compressive stiffness of a solid material when the force is applied lengthwise. It quantifies the relationship between tensile/compressive stress  (force per unit area) and axial strain  (proportional deformation) in the linear elastic region of a material and is determined using the formula:

Young's moduli are typically so large that they are expressed not in pascals but in gigapascals (GPa).

Example:
 Silly Putty (increasing pressure: length increases quickly, meaning low )
 Aluminum (increasing pressure: length increases slowly,  meaning high )
Higher Young's modulus corresponds to greater (lengthwise) stiffness.

Although Young's modulus is named after the 19th-century British scientist Thomas Young, the concept was developed in 1727 by Leonhard Euler. The first experiments that used the concept of Young's modulus in its current form were performed by the Italian scientist Giordano Riccati in 1782, pre-dating Young's work by 25 years.  The term modulus is derived from the Latin root term modus which means measure.

Definition

Linear elasticity 

A solid material will undergo elastic deformation when a small load is applied to it in compression or extension. Elastic deformation is reversible, meaning that the material returns to its original shape after the load is removed.

At near-zero stress and strain, the stress–strain curve is linear, and the relationship between stress and strain is described by Hooke's law that states stress is proportional to strain. The coefficient of proportionality is Young's modulus. The higher the modulus, the more stress is needed to create the same amount of strain; an idealized rigid body would have an infinite Young's modulus. Conversely, a very soft material (such as a fluid) would deform without force, and would have zero Young's modulus.

Not many materials are linear and elastic beyond a small amount of deformation.

Not to be confused with 
Material stiffness should not be confused with these properties:
 Strength: maximum amount of stress that material can withstand while staying in the elastic (reversible) deformation regime;
 Geometric stiffness: a global characteristic of the body that depends on its shape, and not only on the local properties of the material; for instance, an I-beam has a higher bending stiffness than a rod of the same material for a given mass per length;
 Hardness: relative resistance of the material's surface to penetration by a harder body;
 Toughness: amount of energy that a material can absorb before fracture.

Usage 
Young's modulus enables the calculation of the change in the dimension of a bar made of an isotropic elastic material under tensile or compressive loads.  For instance, it predicts how much a material sample extends under tension or shortens under compression. The Young's modulus directly applies to cases of uniaxial stress; that is, tensile or compressive stress in one direction and no stress in the other directions. Young's modulus is also used in order to predict the deflection that will occur in a statically determinate beam when a load is applied at a point in between the beam's supports.

Other elastic calculations usually require the use of one additional elastic property, such as the shear modulus , bulk modulus , and Poisson's ratio . Any two of these parameters are sufficient to fully describe elasticity in an isotropic material. For homogeneous isotropic materials simple relations exist between elastic constants that allow calculating them all as long as two are known:

Linear versus non-linear
Young's modulus represents the factor of proportionality in Hooke's law, which relates the stress and the strain. However, Hooke's law is only valid under the assumption of an elastic and linear response. Any real material will eventually fail and break when stretched over a very large distance or with a very large force; however, all solid materials exhibit nearly Hookean behavior for small enough strains or stresses. If the range over which Hooke's law is valid is large enough compared to the typical stress that one expects to apply to the material, the material is said to be linear. Otherwise, (if the typical stress one would apply is outside the linear range) the material is said to be non-linear.

Steel, carbon fiber and glass among others are usually considered linear materials, while other materials such as rubber and soils are non-linear. However, this is not an absolute classification: if very small stresses or strains are applied to a non-linear material, the response will be linear, but if very high stress or strain is applied to a linear material, the linear theory will not be enough. For example, as the linear theory implies reversibility, it would be absurd to use the linear theory to describe the failure of a steel bridge under a high load; although steel is a linear material for most applications, it is not in such a case of catastrophic failure.

In solid mechanics, the slope of the stress–strain curve at any point is called the tangent modulus. It can be experimentally determined from the slope of a stress–strain curve created during tensile tests conducted on a sample of the material.

Directional materials

Young's modulus is not always the same in all orientations of a material. Most metals and ceramics, along with many other materials, are isotropic, and their mechanical properties are the same in all orientations. However, metals and ceramics can be treated with certain impurities, and metals can be mechanically worked to make their grain structures directional. These materials then become anisotropic, and Young's modulus will change depending on the direction of the force vector. Anisotropy can be seen in many composites as well. For example, carbon fiber has a much higher Young's modulus (is much stiffer) when force is loaded parallel to the fibers (along the grain).  Other such materials include wood and reinforced concrete. Engineers can use this directional phenomenon to their advantage in creating structures.

Temperature dependence 

The Young's modulus of metals varies with the temperature and can be realized through the change in the interatomic bonding of the atoms, and hence its change is found to be dependent on the change in the work function of the metal. Although classically, this change is predicted through fitting and without a clear underlying mechanism (for example, the Watchman's formula), the Rahemi-Li model demonstrates how the change in the electron work function leads to change in the Young's modulus of metals and predicts this variation with calculable parameters, using the generalization of the Lennard-Jones potential to solids.

Calculation

Young's modulus E, can be calculated by dividing the tensile stress, by the engineering extensional strain, in the elastic (initial, linear) portion of the physical stress–strain curve:

where
 is the Young's modulus (modulus of elasticity)
 is the force exerted on an object under tension;
 is the actual cross-sectional area, which equals the area of the cross-section perpendicular to the applied force;
 is the amount by which the length of the object changes ( is positive if the material is stretched, and negative when the material is compressed);
 is the original length of the object.

Force exerted by stretched or contracted material 

The Young's modulus of a material can be used to calculate the force it exerts under specific strain.

Hooke's law for a stretched wire can be derived from this formula:

where it comes in saturation
 and 
But note that the elasticity of coiled springs comes from shear modulus, not Young's modulus.

Elastic potential energy

The elastic potential energy stored in a linear elastic material is given by the integral of the Hooke's law:

now by explicating the intensive variables:

This means that the elastic potential energy density (that is, per unit volume) is given by:

or, in simple notation, for a linear elastic material: , since the strain is defined .

In a nonlinear elastic material the Young's modulus is a function of the strain, so the second equivalence no longer holds, and the elastic energy is not a quadratic function of the strain:

Approximate values 

Young's modulus can vary somewhat due to differences in sample composition and test method. The rate of deformation has the greatest impact on the data collected, especially in polymers. The values here are approximate and only meant for relative comparison.

See also 
 Bending stiffness
 Deflection
 Deformation
 Flexural modulus
 Hooke's law
 Impulse excitation technique
 List of materials properties
 Yield (engineering)

References

Further reading
 ASTM E 111, "Standard Test Method for Young's Modulus, Tangent Modulus, and Chord Modulus" 
 The ASM Handbook (various volumes) contains Young's Modulus for various materials and information on calculations. Online version

External links
 Matweb: free database of engineering properties for over 115,000 materials
 Young's Modulus for groups of materials, and their cost

Elasticity (physics)
Physical quantities
Structural analysis